Francisco Naranjilla (5 June 1932 – May 2003) was a Filipino archer. He competed in the men's individual event at the 1972 Summer Olympics.

References

External links
 

1932 births
2003 deaths
Filipino male archers
Olympic archers of the Philippines
Archers at the 1972 Summer Olympics
Place of birth missing